Manabezho Falls is a waterfall on the Presque Isle River and is located in the Porcupine Mountains Wilderness State Park in Gogebic County, Michigan.  With a drop of approximately 25 feet and a crest of 150 feet, it is the largest of the waterfalls on the river.  It is below Manido Falls and Nawadaha Falls.  The name Manabezho refers to an Ojibway spirit god.  A view of the falls is easily accessible by trail.

References
Great Lakes Waterfalls

Protected areas of Gogebic County, Michigan
Waterfalls of Michigan
Landforms of Gogebic County, Michigan